Trédrez-Locquémeau is a commune in the Côtes-d'Armor department of Brittany in northwestern France.

Population

Inhabitants of Trédrez-Locquémeau are called trédréziens in French, while those from Locquemeau are described in French as locquémois

Breton language
The municipality launched a linguistic plan through Ya d'ar brezhoneg on 25 July 2006.

See also
Communes of the Côtes-d'Armor department

References

External links

Communes of Côtes-d'Armor